Naniarchar is an Upazila of Rangamati District in the Division of Chittagong, Bangladesh.

Geography
It has 6043 units of household and total area .

Demographics
As of the 1991 Bangladesh census, Naniarchar has a population of 34561. Males constitute 52.67% of the population, and females 47.33%. This Upazila's eighteen up population is 16882. Naniarchar has an average literacy rate of 33.9% (7+ years), and the national average of 32.4% literate.

Administration
Naniarchar Upazila is divided into four union parishads: Burighat, Ghilachhari, Naniarchar, and Sabekkhong. The union parishads are subdivided into 20 mauzas and 158 villages.

See also
Districts of Bangladesh
Divisions of Bangladesh
Rangamati Hill District
Upazilas of Bangladesh

References

Upazilas of Rangamati Hill District